

Days of the month

31 January 2013 (Thursday)

Bicycle racing
Road bicycle racing:
3rd stage Ladies Tour of Qatar in Qatar:
1. Kirsten Wild 
2. Ellen van Dijk 
3. Giorgia Bronzini

30 January 2013 (Wednesday)

Bicycle racing
Road bicycle racing:
2nd stage Ladies Tour of Qatar in Qatar:
1. Kirsten Wild 
2. Trixi Worrack 
3. Ellen van Dijk

29 January 2013 (Tuesday)

Bicycle racing
Road bicycle racing:
1st stage Ladies Tour of Qatar in Qatar:
1. Chloe Hosking 
2. Gracie Elvin 
3. Lisa Brennauer

27 January 2013 (Sunday)

Auto racing
Sports cars endurance racing:
24 Hours of Daytona in Daytona Beach, Florida, United States:
1. Charlie Kimball  Juan Pablo Montoya  Scott Pruett Memo Rojas 
2. Max Angelelli  Ryan Hunter-Reay  Jordan Taylor 
3. A. J. Allmendinger  Marcos Ambrose Oswaldo Negri  John Pew  Justin Wilson

26 January 2013 (Saturday)

American football
NCAA bowl games
2013 Senior Bowl
In Mobile, Alabama: South 21, North 16
In the concluding game of the college football post-season, Florida State's EJ Manuel led the South all-star squad to a victory.  His contributions included a touchdown and rushing on the South team's initial two drives.

22 January 2013 (Tuesday)

Ice hockey
NHL regular season:
In Raleigh, North Carolina: Tampa Bay Lightning 4, Carolina Hurricanes 1. 
In Washington, D.C.: Winnipeg Jets 4, Washington Capitals 2.
In Newark, New Jersey: New Jersey Devils 3, Philadelphia Flyers 0.
In Montreal, Quebec: Montreal Canadiens 4, Florida Panthers 1. 
In Detroit, Michigan: Dallas Stars 2, Detroit Red Wings 1.
In St. Paul, Minnesota: Nashville Predators 3, Minnesota Wild 1.

21 January 2013 (Monday)

Handball
World Men's Handball Championship in Spain:
Round of 16:
In Barcelona:
 31–26 
 27–19 
In Zaragoza:
 20–31 
 33–24 
17–20th place semifinals in Guadalajara:
 30–26 
 24–28 
21–24th place semifinals in Guadalajara:
 35–31 
 36–14

Ice hockey
NHL regular season:
In Uniondale, New York: New York Islanders 4, Tampa Bay Lightning 3.
In Boston, Massachusetts: Boston Bruins 2, Winnipeg Jets 1 (SO)
In Nashville, Tennessee: St. Louis Blues 4, Nashville Predators 3.
In Toronto, Ontario: Buffalo Sabres 2, Toronto Maple Leafs 1.
In Kanata, Ontario: Ottawa Senators 4, Florida Panthers 0.
In Columbus, Ohio: Detroit Red Wings 4, Columbus Blue Jackets 3.
In Calgary, Alberta: Anaheim Ducks 5, Calgary Flames 4.

20 January 2013 (Sunday)

Alpine skiing
Men's World Cup:
Slalom in Wengen, Switzerland:  Felix Neureuther   Marcel Hirscher   Ivica Kostelić 
Overall standings (after 21 of 36 races): (1) Hirscher 935 points (2) Aksel Lund Svindal  747 (3) Ted Ligety  696
Slalom standings (after 7 of 11 races): (1) Hirscher 600 points (2) Neureuther 486 (3) André Myhrer  330
Women's World Cup:
Super Giant Slalom in Cortina d'Ampezzo, Italy:  Viktoria Rebensburg   Nicole Schmidhofer   Tina Maze 
Overall standings (after 23 of 37 races): (1) Maze 1474 points (2) Maria Höfl-Riesch  756 (3) Anna Fenninger  644
Super Giant Slalom standings (after 4 of 7 races): (1) Maze 290 points (2) Lindsey Vonn  286 (3) Julia Mancuso  225

Curling
Women's World Curling Tour:
Glynhill Ladies International final in Glasgow, Scotland: Binia Feltscher  8–1 Heather Nedohin 
The Dominion All-Star Skins Game in Rama, Ontario: 
Final: Team Glenn Howard $22,000–$20,000 Team Kevin Koe
British Columbia Scotties Tournament of Hearts in Cloverdale, British Columbia:
Final: Kelly Scott (Kelowna) 9–6 Patti Knezevic (Prince George)
Scott will represent British Columbia at the Scotties Tournament of Hearts.

Handball
World Men's Handball Championship in Spain:
Round of 16:
In Barcelona:
 28–23 
 28–30 
In Zaragoza:
 26–27 
 30–23

Ice hockey
NHL regular season:
In Buffalo, New York: Buffalo Sabres 5, Philadelphia Flyers 2.
In Calgary, Alberta: San Jose Sharks 4, Calgary Flames 1. 
In New York: Pittsburgh Penguins 6, New York Rangers 3. 
In St. Paul, Minnesota: Minnesota Wild 1, Dallas Stars 0.
In Vancouver, British Columbia: Edmonton Oilers 3, Vancouver Canucks 2 (SO).
In Glendale, Arizona: Chicago Blackhawks 6, Phoenix Coyotes 4.

Nordic combined
World Cup:
HS 109 / 10 km in Seefeld, Austria:  Eric Frenzel   Mikko Kokslien   Taylor Fletcher 
Standings (after 9 of 17 races): (1) Jason Lamy-Chappuis  527 points (2) Magnus Moan  508 (3) Frenzel 474

Rugby union
Top League playoffs:
Semifinals in Tokyo: Panasonic Wild Knights 8–20 Toshiba Brave Lupus

19 January 2013 (Saturday)

Alpine skiing
Men's World Cup:
Downhill in Wengen, Switzerland:  Christof Innerhofer   Klaus Kröll   Hannes Reichelt 
Overall standings (after 20 of 36 races): (1) Marcel Hirscher  855 points (2) Aksel Lund Svindal  747 (3) Ted Ligety  676
Downhill standings (after 5 of 9 races): (1) Svindal 285 points (2) Innerhofer 233 (3) Kröll 221
Women's World Cup:
Downhill in Cortina d'Ampezzo, Italy:  Lindsey Vonn   Tina Maze   Leanne Smith 
Overall standings (after 22 of 37 races): (1) Maze 1414 points (2) Maria Höfl-Riesch  744 (3) Anna Fenninger  630
Downhill standings (after 5 of 8 races): (1) Vonn 340 points (2) Stacey Cook  211 (3) Maze 189

Curling
The Dominion All-Star Skins Game, semifinals in Rama, Ontario:
Team Kevin Koe $17,500–$3,500 Team Jeff Stoughton
Team Glenn Howard $14,500–$6,500 Team Kevin Martin
Newfoundland and Labrador Scotties Tournament of Hearts in St. John's, Newfoundland and Labrador:
Final #2: Stacie Devereaux (Bally Haly) 8–7 Heather Strong (Bally Haly)
Devereaux will represent Newfoundland and Labrador at the Scotties Tournament of Hearts.

Handball
World Men's Handball Championship in Spain (teams in bold advance to the main round):
Group C in Zaragoza:
 33–15 
 33–25 
 31–33 
Final standings: Slovenia 10 points, Poland 8, Serbia 6, Belarus 4, Saudi Arabia 2, South Korea 0.
Group D in Madrid:
 39–14 
 25–27 
 29–26 
Final standings: Croatia 10 points, Spain 8, Hungary 6, Egypt, Algeria 3, Australia 0.

Ice hockey
NHL season opening day:
In Philadelphia, Pennsylvania: Pittsburgh Penguins 3, Philadelphia Flyers 1.
In Winnipeg, Manitoba: Ottawa Senators 4, Winnipeg Jets 1.
In Los Angeles, California: Chicago Blackhawks 5, Los Angeles Kings 2.
In Boston, Massachusetts: Boston Bruins 3, New York Rangers 1.
In Montreal, Quebec: Toronto Maple Leafs 2, Montreal Canadiens 1.
In Uniondale, New York: New Jersey Devils 2, New York Islanders 1.
In Tampa, Florida: Tampa Bay Lightning 6, Washington Capitals 3.
In Sunrise, Florida: Florida Panthers 5, Carolina Hurricanes 1.
In St. Louis, Missouri: St. Louis Blues 6, Detroit Red Wings 0.
In Nashville, Tennessee: Columbus Blue Jackets 3, Nashville Predators 2 (SO).
In Dallas, Texas: Dallas Stars 4, Phoenix Coyotes 3.
In St. Paul, Minnesota: Minnesota Wild 4, Colorado Avalanche 2.
In Vancouver, British Columbia: Anaheim Ducks 7, Vancouver Canucks 3.

Mixed martial arts
UFC on FX: Belfort vs. Bisping in São Paulo, Brazil:
Lightweight bout: Khabib Nurmagomedov  def. Thiago Tavares  via KO (elbows)
Heavyweight bout: Gabriel Gonzaga  def. Ben Rothwell  via submission (guillotine choke)
Middleweight bout: CB Dollaway  def. Daniel Sarafian  via split decision (29–28, 28–29, 29–28)
Middleweight bout: Vitor Belfort  def. Michael Bisping  via TKO (head kick and punches)

Nordic combined
World Cup:
HS 109 / 10 km in Seefeld, Austria:  Eric Frenzel   Magnus Moan   Tino Edelmann 
Standings (after 8 of 17 races): (1) Jason Lamy-Chappuis  511 points (2) Moan 468 (3) Frenzel 374

Rugby union
Top League playoffs:
Semifinals in Tokyo: Suntory Sungoliath 38–19 Kobelco Steelers

18 January 2013 (Friday)

Alpine skiing
Men's World Cup:
Super Combined in Wengen, Switzerland:  Alexis Pinturault   Ivica Kostelić   Carlo Janka 
Overall standings (after 19 of 36 races): (1) Marcel Hirscher  855 points (2) Aksel Lund Svindal  747 (3) Ted Ligety  676

Handball
World Men's Handball Championship in Spain (teams in bold advance to the main round):
Group A in Barcelona:
 18–22 
 30–32 
 25–26 
Final standings: Germany, France 8 points, Brazil, Tunisia 6, Argentina 2, Montenegro 0.
Group B in Seville:
 36–24 
 39–29 
 33–30 
Final standings: Denmark 10 points, Russia 7, Iceland 6, Macedonia 5, Qatar 2, Chile 0.

17 January 2013 (Thursday)

Handball
World Men's Handball Championship in Spain (teams in bold advance to the main round):
Group C in Zaragoza:
 27–26 
 24–22 
 25–24 
Standings (after 4 games): Slovenia 8 points, Poland, Serbia 6, Belarus, Saudi Arabia 2, South Korea 0.
Group D in Madrid:
 15–39 
 22–28 
 24–20 
Standings (after 4 games): Spain, Croatia 8 points, Hungary 4, Algeria 3, Egypt 1, Australia 0.

16 January 2013 (Wednesday)

Basketball
NBA:
In Oakland, California: Miami Heat 92, Golden State Warriors 75.
Heat forward LeBron James becomes the youngest player in NBA history to score 20,000 career points.
PBA Philippine Cup Finals:
Game 4 in Quezon City, Philippines: Talk 'N Text Tropang Texters 105, Rain or Shine Elasto Painters 82. Talk 'N Text win series 4–0.
Talk 'N Text win their third consecutive PBA Philippine Cup, a league record.

Curling
Pacific-Asia Junior Championships in Tokoro, Japan:
Men's final:  7–5 
Women's final:  7–4

Handball
World Men's Handball Championship in Spain (teams in bold advance to the main round):
Group A in Granollers:
 27–22 
 29–21 
 23–35 
Standings (after 4 games): France 8 points, Germany 6, Tunisia, Brazil 4, Argentina 2, Montenegro 0.
Group B in Seville:
 29–29 
 23–31 
 28–36 
Standings (after 4 games): Denmark 8 points, Russia, Macedonia 5, Iceland 4, Qatar 2, Chile 0.

15 January 2013 (Tuesday)

Alpine skiing
Women's World Cup:
Slalom in Flachau, Austria:  Mikaela Shiffrin   Frida Hansdotter   Tanja Poutiainen 
Overall standings (after 21 of 37 races): (1) Tina Maze  1334 points (2) Maria Höfl-Riesch  744 (3) Kathrin Zettel  597
Slalom standings (after 7 of 11 races): (1) Shiffrin 436 points (2) Maze 355 (3) Veronika Zuzulová  305

Handball
World Men's Handball Championship in Spain (teams in bold advance to the main round):
Group A in Granollers:
 27–25 
 31–27 
 27–22 
Standings (after 3 games): France 6 points, Tunisia, Germany 4, Brazil, Argentina 2, Montenegro 0.
Group B in Seville:
 22–29 
 19–23 
 43–24 
Standings (after 3 games): Denmark 6 points, Iceland, Russia, Macedonia 4, Qatar, Chile 0.
Group C in Zaragoza:
 20–26 
 30–20 
 25–24 
Standings (after 3 games): Serbia, Slovenia 6 points, Poland 4, Belarus 2, South Korea, Saudi Arabia 0.
Group D in Madrid:
 24–24 
 51–11 
 30–21 
Standings (after 3 games): Spain, Croatia 6 points, Hungary 4, Egypt, Algeria 1, Australia 0.

14 January 2013 (Monday)

Handball
World Men's Handball Championship in Spain:
Group C in Zaragoza:
 27–34 
 28–34 
 14–28 
Standings (after 2 games): Slovenia, Poland, Serbia 4 points, Belarus, South Korea, Saudi Arabia 0.
Group D in Madrid:
 20–31 
 24–29 
 13–43 
Standings (after 2 games): Hungary, Croatia, Spain 4 points, Egypt, Algeria, Australia 0.

13 January 2013 (Sunday)

Alpine skiing
Men's World Cup:
Slalom in Adelboden, Switzerland:  Marcel Hirscher   Mario Matt   Manfred Mölgg 
Overall standings (after 18 of 36 races): (1) Hirscher 855 points (2) Aksel Lund Svindal  729 (3) Ted Ligety  676
Slalom standings (after 6 of 11 races): (1) Hirscher 520 points (2) Felix Neureuther  386 (3) André Myhrer  330
Women's World Cup:
Super Giant Slalom in St. Anton, Austria:  Tina Maze   Anna Fenninger   Fabienne Suter 
Overall standings (after 20 of 37 races): (1) Maze 1289 points (2) Maria Höfl-Riesch  744 (3) Kathrin Zettel  597
Super Giant Slalom standings (after 3 of 7 races): (1) Lindsey Vonn  250 points (2) Maze 230 (3) Julia Mancuso  180

American football
NFL playoffs:
NFC Divisional playoffs in Atlanta, Georgia: Atlanta Falcons 30, Seattle Seahawks 28.
AFC Divisional playoffs in Foxborough, Massachusetts: New England Patriots 41, Houston Texans 28.

Basketball
PBA Philippine Cup Finals:
Game 3 in Quezon City, Philippines: Talk 'N Text Tropang Texters 89, Rain or Shine Elasto Painters 80. Talk 'N Text lead series 3–0.

Curling
Continental Cup of Curling, final day in Penticton, British Columbia:  Team North America 37–23  Team World
Early draw (Skins)
Men's game: Niklas Edin (World) 3½–1½ Heath McCormick (North America)
Mixed game: John Morris (North America) 3½–1½ Tom Brewster (World)
Women's game: Margaretha Sigfridsson (World) 3–2 Allison Pottinger (North America)
Late draw (Skins)
Women's game: Jennifer Jones (North America) 4–1 Mirjam Ott (World)
Mixed game: Kevin Martin (North America) 3½–1½ Eve Muirhead (World)
Men's game: Glenn Howard (North America) 3–2 Thomas Ulsrud (World) 
North America win the Cup for the fourth time.
Women's World Curling Tour:
International Bernese Ladies Cup final in Bern, Switzerland: Silvana Tirinzoni  6–3 Lene Nielsen 
Northwest Territories Men's Curling Championship in Fort Smith, Northwest Territories:
Jamie Koe (Yellowknife) defeats Greg Skauge (Yellowknife) 4–2 in the final round robin game to clinch the championship. Koe will represent the Yukon/Northwest Territories at the Hortons Brier.
NWT/Yukon Scotties Tournament of Hearts in Fort Smith, Northwest Territories:
Tie breaker (Final): Kerry Galusha (Yellowknife) 10–3 Ashley Green (Yellowknife)
Galusha will represent the Yukon/Northwest Territories at the Scotties Tournament of Hearts.

Handball
World Men's Handball Championship in Spain:
Group A in Granollers:
 24–20 
 25–23 
 20–32 
Standings (after 2 games): France 4 points, Germany, Tunisia, Argentina, Brazil 2, Montenegro 0.
Group B in Seville:
 22–38 
 30–34 
 27–31 
Standings (after 2 games): Denmark, Macedonia 4 points, Iceland, Russia 2, Qatar, Chile 0.

Ice hockey
Kontinental Hockey League All-Star Game in Chelyabinsk, Russia: Team East 18, Team West 11.

Nordic combined
World Cup:
HS 118 / Team sprint in Chaux-Neuve, France:  Eric Frenzel/Tino Edelmann   Magnus Moan/Jørgen Graabak   Sébastien Lacroix/Jason Lamy-Chappuis

12 January 2013 (Saturday)

Alpine skiing
Men's World Cup:
Giant Slalom in Adelboden, Switzerland:  Ted Ligety   Fritz Dopfer   Felix Neureuther 
Overall standings (after 17 of 36 races): (1) Marcel Hirscher  755 points (2) Aksel Lund Svindal  729 (3) Ligety 652
Giant Slalom standings (after 5 of 8 races): (1) Ligety 460 points (2) Hirscher 335 (3) Manfred Mölgg  212
Women's World Cup:
Downhill in St. Anton, Austria:  Alice McKennis   Daniela Merighetti   Anna Fenninger 
Overall standings (after 19 of 37 races): (1) Tina Maze  1189 points (2) Maria Höfl-Riesch  699 (3) Kathrin Zettel  597
Downhill standings (after 4 of 8 races): (1) Lindsey Vonn  240 points (2) Stacey Cook  195 (3) Merighetti 161

American football
NFL playoffs:
AFC Divisional playoffs in Denver, Colorado: Baltimore Ravens 38, Denver Broncos 35 (2OT).
NFC Divisional playoffs in San Francisco, California: San Francisco 49ers 45, Green Bay Packers 31.

Curling
Continental Cup of Curling, day 3 in Penticton, British Columbia:  Team North America  19.5–10.5  Team World
Mixed doubles competition:
Glenn Howard/Natalie Nicholson (North America) 7–6 Greg Drummond/Anna Sloan (World)
Brent Laing/Jennifer Jones (North America) 7–5 Torger Nergård/Carmen Küng (World)
Heath McCormick/Jessica Mair (North America) 9–3 Sebastian Kraupp/Maria Prytz (World)
Women's team competition:
Jennifer Jones (North America) 5–4 Eve Muirhead (World)
Margaretha Sigfridsson (World) 5–5 Allison Pottinger (North America)
Mirjam Ott (World) 6–2 Heather Nedohin (North America)
Men's team competition:
Kevin Martin (North America) 8–3 Thomas Ulsrud (World)
Heath McCormick (North America) 4–3 Tom Brewster (World)
Niklas Edin (World) 5–4 Glenn Howard (North America)

Handball
World Men's Handball Championship in Spain:
Group A in Granollers:
 33–23 
 28–26 
 30–27 
Group B in Seville:
 30–28 
 25–30 
 41–27 
Group C in Zaragoza:
 31–22 
 32–22 
 24–22 
Group D in Madrid:
 36–13 
 32–23

Mixed martial arts
Strikeforce: Marquardt vs. Saffiedine in Oklahoma City, Oklahoma, United States:
Catchweight (194 lb) bout: Ronaldo Souza  def. Ed Herman  via submission (kimura)
Light Heavyweight bout: Gegard Mousasi  def. Mike Kyle  via submission (rear naked choke)
Heavyweight bout: Josh Barnett  def. Nandor Guelmino  via submission (arm triangle choke)
Heavyweight bout: Daniel Cormier  def. Dion Staring  via TKO (punches)
Welterweight Championship bout: Tarec Saffiedine  def. Nate Marquardt  (c) via unanimous decision (48–47, 49–46, 49–46)

Nordic combined
World Cup:
HS 118 / 10 km in Chaux-Neuve, France:  Tino Edelmann   Bernhard Gruber   Akito Watabe 
Standings (after 7 of 17 races): (1) Jason Lamy-Chappuis  495 points (2) Magnus Moan  388 (3) Gruber 304

11 January 2013 (Friday)

Basketball
PBA Philippine Cup Finals:
Game 2 in Pasay, Philippines: Talk 'N Text Tropang Texters 89, Rain or Shine Elasto Painters 81. Talk 'N Text lead series 2–0.

Curling
Continental Cup of Curling, day 2 in Penticton, British Columbia:  Team North America  13–8  Team World
Women's team competition:
Margaretha Sigfridsson (World) 4–4 Heather Nedohin (North America)
Jennifer Jones (North America) 6–5 Mirjam Ott (World)
Allison Pottinger (North America) 9–4 Eve Muirhead (World) 
Singles competition:
Tom Brewster (World) 14–8 Heath McCormick (North America)
Glenn Howard (North America) 22–17 Thomas Ulsrud (World)
Kevin Martin (North America) 17–13 Niklas Edin (World)
Heather Nedohin (North America) 17–11 Eve Muirhead (World)
Mirjam Ott (World) 18–11 Jennifer Jones (North America)
Allison Pottinger (North America) 18–13 Margaretha Sigfridsson
Men's team competition:
Tom Brewster (World) 5–5 Glenn Howard (North America)
Kevin Martin (North America) 6–3 Niklas Edin (World)
Heath McCormick (North America) 8–3 Thomas Ulsrud (World)

Handball
World Men's Handball Championship in Spain:
Group D in Madrid:  27–14

10 January 2013 (Thursday)

Curling
Continental Cup of Curling, day 1 in Penticton, British Columbia:  Team World 5–4  Team North America 
Women's team competition:
Mirjam Ott (World) 9–7 Allison Pottinger (North America)
Eve Muirhead (World) 8–3 Heather Nedohin (North America)
Margaretha Sigfridsson (World) 6–6 Jennifer Jones (North America)
Mixed doubles competition:
Christoffer Svae/Carmen Schäfer (World) 8–7 Marc Kennedy/Allison Pottinger (North America)
Michael Goodfellow/Eve Muirhead (World) 5–5 Dean Gemmell/Heather Nedohin (North America)
John Morris/Kaitlyn Lawes (North America) 10–3 Niklas Edin/Christina Bertrup (World)
Men's team competition:
Niklas Edin (World) 8–7 Heath McCormick (North America)
Glenn Howard (North America) 6–3 Thomas Ulsrud (World)
Kevin Martin (North America) 4–3 Tom Brewster (World)

9 January 2013 (Wednesday)

Basketball
PBA Philippine Cup Finals:
Game 1 in Quezon City, Philippines: Talk 'N Text Tropang Texters 87, Rain or Shine Elasto Painters 81. Talk 'N Text lead series 1–0.

8 January 2013 (Tuesday)

Basketball
NBA:
In Houston, Texas: Houston Rockets 125, Los Angeles Lakers 112.
Despite losing the game, Lakers guard Steve Nash becomes the fifth player in NBA history to surpass 10,000 career assists.

Curling
European Junior Curling Challenge in Prague, Czech Republic:
Men's final:  7–6 
Women's final:  4–1

7 January 2013 (Monday)

American football
NCAA bowl games (BCS standings in brackets):
Bowl Championship Series:
BCS National Championship Game in Miami Gardens, Florida: [2] Alabama 42, [1] Notre Dame 14.
Alabama wins their third National Championship title in four years, defeating the Fighting Irish, the last bowl-eligible undefeated team, and in the process, the Tide successfully defends their unanimous National Championship, having topped both the BCS and AP polls.

6 January 2013 (Sunday)

Alpine skiing
Men's World Cup:
Slalom in Zagreb, Croatia:  Marcel Hirscher   André Myhrer   Mario Matt 
Overall standings (after 16 of 36 races): (1) Hirscher 740 points (2) Aksel Lund Svindal  689 (3) Ted Ligety  552
Slalom standings (after 5 of 11 races): (1) Hirscher 420 points (2) Felix Neureuther  341 (3) Myhrer 330

American football
NFL playoffs:
AFC Wild Card playoffs in Baltimore, Maryland: Baltimore Ravens 24, Indianapolis Colts 9.
NFC Wild Card playoffs in Landover, Maryland: Seattle Seahawks 24, Washington Redskins 14.
NCAA bowl games (BCS standings in brackets):
GoDaddy.com Bowl in Mobile, Alabama: Arkansas State 17, [25] Kent State 13.

Cricket
Pakistan in India:
3rd ODI in Delhi:  167 (43.4 overs);  157 (48.5 overs). India win by 10 runs; Pakistan win 3-match series 2–1.

Cross-country skiing
Tour de Ski:
Stage 7 in Fiemme Valley, Italy:
Men's 9 km Freestyle Final Climb:  Marcus Hellner   Ivan Babikov   Roland Clara 
Tour de Ski final standings: (1) Alexander Legkov  3:29:28.6 (2) Dario Cologna  +18.7 (3) Maxim Vylegzhanin  +40.7
Legkov wins his first Tour de Ski title.
Women's 9 km Freestyle Final Climb:  Therese Johaug   Liz Stephen   Heidi Weng 
Tour de Ski final standings: (1) Justyna Kowalczyk  2:25:21.6 (2) Johaug +27.9 (3) Kristin Størmer Steira  +2:39.5
Kowalczyk wins the Tour de Ski for the fourth successive time.

Curling
Men's World Curling Tour:
Mercure Perth Masters final in Perth, Scotland: Thomas Ulsrud  7–2 Mike McEwen

Nordic combined
World Cup:
HS 106 / 10 km in Schonach, Germany:  Jason Lamy-Chappuis   Akito Watabe   Magnus Moan 
Standings (after 6 of 17 races): (1) Lamy-Chappuis 455 points (2) Moan 383 (3) Eric Frenzel  and Watabe 229

Ski jumping
Four Hills Tournament:
Stage 4, HS 140 in Bischofshofen, Austria:  Gregor Schlierenzauer   Anders Jacobsen   Stefan Kraft 
Tournament final standings: (1) Schlierenzauer 1100.2 points (2) Jacobsen 1087.2 (3) Tom Hilde  1029.2
Schlierenzauer wins the Four Hills Tournament for the second successive time.

5 January 2013 (Saturday)

American football
NFL playoffs:
AFC Wild Card playoffs in Houston, Texas: Houston Texans 19, Cincinnati Bengals 13.
NFC Wild Card playoffs in Green Bay, Wisconsin: Green Bay Packers 24, Minnesota Vikings 10.
NCAA bowl games:
BBVA Compass Bowl in Birmingham, Alabama: Ole Miss 38, Pittsburgh 17.

Cross-country skiing
Tour de Ski:
Stage 6 in Fiemme Valley, Italy:
Men's 15 km Classical Mass Start:  Alexey Poltoranin   Len Väljas   Alex Harvey 
Tour de Ski standings (after 6 of 7 races): (1) Dario Cologna  2:58:25.2 (2) Alexander Legkov  +6.5 (3) Petter Northug  +11.7
Women's 10 km Classical Mass Start:  Justyna Kowalczyk   Kristin Størmer Steira   Krista Lähteenmäki 
Tour de Ski standings (after 6 of 7 races): (1) Kowalczyk 1:49:29.1 (2) Therese Johaug  +2:08.0 (3) Steira +2:17.9

Nordic combined
World Cup:
HS 106 / Team in Schonach, Germany:  Håvard Klemetsen/Magnus Moan/Mikko Kokslien/Jørgen Graabak   Johannes Rydzek/Tino Edelmann/Björn Kircheisen/Eric Frenzel   Bryan Fletcher/Taylor Fletcher/Todd Lodwick/Bill Demong

4 January 2013 (Friday)

Alpine skiing
Women's World Cup:
Slalom in Zagreb, Croatia:  Mikaela Shiffrin   Frida Hansdotter   Erin Mielzynski 
Overall standings (after 18 of 37 races): (1) Tina Maze  1139 points (2) Maria Höfl-Riesch  687 (3) Kathrin Zettel  597
Slalom standings (after 6 of 11 races): (1) Shiffrin 336 points (2) Maze 310 (3) Veronika Zuzulová  305

American football
NCAA bowl games (BCS standings in brackets):
Cotton Bowl Classic in Arlington, Texas: [9] Texas A&M 41, [11] Oklahoma 13.

Cross-country skiing
Tour de Ski:
Stage 5 in Toblach, Italy:
Men's 5 km Classical Individual Start:  Alexey Poltoranin   Petter Northug   Dario Cologna 
Tour de Ski standings (after 5 of 7 races): (1) Northug 2:19:20.9 (2) Cologna +16.1 (3) Alexander Legkov  +23.4
Women's 3 km Classical Individual Start:  Justyna Kowalczyk   Krista Lähteenmäki   Astrid Uhrenholdt Jacobsen 
Tour de Ski standings (after 5 of 7 races): (1) Kowalczyk 1:22:01.2 (2) Charlotte Kalla  +1:03.6 (3) Therese Johaug  +1:05.9

Ski jumping
Four Hills Tournament:
Stage 3, HS 130 in Innsbruck, Austria:  Gregor Schlierenzauer   Kamil Stoch   Anders Bardal 
Tournament standings (after 3 of 4 events): (1) Schlierenzauer 827.5 points (2) Anders Jacobsen  816.8 (3) Tom Hilde  778.3

3 January 2013 (Thursday)

American football
NCAA bowl games (BCS standings in brackets):
Bowl Championship Series:
Fiesta Bowl in Glendale, Arizona: [4] Oregon 35, [5] Kansas State 17.

Cricket
Pakistan in India:
2nd ODI in Kolkata:  250 (48.3 overs);  165 (48 overs). Pakistan win by 85 runs; lead 3-match series 2–0.

Cross-country skiing
Tour de Ski:
Stage 4 in Cortina d'Ampezzo–Toblach, Italy:
Men's 35 km Freestyle Pursuit:  Petter Northug   Alexander Legkov   Dario Cologna 
Tour de Ski standings (after 4 of 7 races): (1) Northug 2:06:45.0 (2) Legkov +5.7 (3) Cologna +10.9
Women's 15 km Freestyle Pursuit:  Justyna Kowalczyk   Charlotte Kalla   Therese Johaug 
Tour de Ski standings (after 4 of 7 races): (1) Kowalczyk 1:12:08.1 (2) Kalla +23.3 (3) Johaug +28.7

Ekiden
Hakone Ekiden, 2nd Half in Japan:
6th Section, 20.8 km from Lake Ashi to Odawara:  Kenta Chiba, Komazawa University  Daiki Hirose, Meiji University  Kazuyoshi Chiba, Teikyo University
General classification: (1)  Nippon Sport Science University 6h 39' 48" (2) 1 Toyo University + 2' 22" (3) 1 Meiji University + 3' 08"
7th Section, 21.3 km from Odawara to Hiratsuka:  Kazuma Ganaha, Kanagawa University  Shoji Tanaka, Nippon Sport Science University  Yuki Arimura, Meiji University
General classification: (1)  Nippon Sport Science University 7h 44' 41" (2)  Toyo University + 2' 51" (3)  Meiji University + 3' 16"
8th Section, 21.5 km from Hiratsuka to Totsuka:  Soshi Takahashi, Aoyama Gakuin University  Yuya Takayanagi, Nippon Sport Science University  Daiki Igari, Teikyo University
General classification: (1)  Nippon Sport Science University 8h 51' 44" (2)  Toyo University + 3' 12" (3)  Meiji University + 3' 52"
9th Section, 23.2 km from Totsuka to Tsurumi:  Wataru Ueno, Komazawa University  Keigo Yano, Nippon Sport Science University  Yuma Hattori, Toyo University
General classification: (1)  Nippon Sport Science University 10h 02' 10" (2)  Toyo University + 3' 48" (3) 3 Komazawa University + 6' 24" 
10th Section, 23.1 km from Tsurumi to Ōtemachi:  Kensuke Gotoda, Komazawa University  Yuichi Taninaga, Nippon Sport Science University  Taketo Kumazaki, Teikyo University
Final general classification: (1)  Nippon Sport Science University 11h 13' 26" (2)  Toyo University + 4' 54" (3)  Komazawa University + 5' 57"
Nippon Sport Science University wins the Hakone Ekiden for the first time since 1983 and tenth time overall.

2 January 2013 (Wednesday)

American football
NCAA bowl games (BCS standings in brackets):
Bowl Championship Series:
Sugar Bowl in New Orleans, Louisiana: [21] Louisville 33, [3] Florida 23.

Ekiden
Hakone Ekiden, 1st Half in Japan:
1st Section, 21.4 km from Ōtemachi to Tsurumi:  Masaya Taguchi, Toyo University  Kei Fumimoto, Meiji University  Kazuto Nishiike, Hosei University
2nd Section, 23.2 km from Tsurumi to Totsuka:  Gandu Benjamin, Nihon University  Omwamba Enock, Yamanashi Gakuin University  Keita Shitara, Toyo University
General classification: (1) 12 Nihon University 2h 14' 00" (2) 1 Toyo University + 1" (3) 4 Nippon Sport Science University + 54"
3rd Section, 21.5 km from Totsuka to Hiratsuka:  Yuta Shitara, Toyo University  Suguru Osako, Waseda University  Shogo Nakamura, Komazawa University
General classification: (1) 1 Toyo University 3h 18' 37" (2) 4 Komazawa University + 2' 41" (3) 9 Waseda University + 2' 45"
4th Section, 18.5 km from Hiratsuka to Odawara:  Hideyuki Tanaka, Juntendo University  Shohei Hayakawa, Teikyo University  Kazutaka Kuroyama, Hosei University
General classification: (1)  Toyo University 4h 17' 51" (2) 2 Nippon Sport Science University + 1' 49" (3)  Waseda University + 2' 07"
5th Section, 23.4 km from Odawara to Lake Ashi:  Shota Hattori, Nippon Sport Science University  Shogo Sekiguchi, Hosei University  Shuhei Yamamoto, Waseda University
General classification: (1) 1 Nippon Sport Science University 5h 40' 15" (2) 1 Waseda University + 2' 36" (3) 2 Toyo University + 2' 39"

1 January 2013 (Tuesday)

Alpine skiing
Men's World Cup:
Parallel in Munich, Germany:  Felix Neureuther   Marcel Hirscher   Alexis Pinturault 
Overall standings (after 15 of 36 races): (1) Aksel Lund Svindal  689 points (2) Hirscher 640 (3) Ted Ligety  552
Women's World Cup:
Parallel in Munich, Germany:  Veronika Zuzulová   Tina Maze   Michaela Kirchgasser 
Overall standings (after 17 of 37 races): (1) Maze 1139 points (2) Maria Höfl-Riesch  647 (3) Kathrin Zettel  597

American football
NCAA bowl games (BCS standings in brackets):
Bowl Championship Series:
Rose Bowl in Pasadena, California: [6] Stanford 20, Wisconsin 14.
Orange Bowl in Miami Gardens, Florida: [12] Florida State 31, [15] Northern Illinois 10.
Other games:
Gator Bowl in Jacksonville, Florida: [20] Northwestern 34, Mississippi State 20.
Heart of Dallas Bowl in Dallas, Texas: Oklahoma State 58, Purdue 14.
Capital One Bowl in Orlando, Florida: [7] Georgia 45, [16] Nebraska 31.
Outback Bowl in Tampa, Florida: [10] South Carolina 33, [18] Michigan 28.

Cross-country skiing
Tour de Ski:
Stage 3 in Val Müstair, Italy:
Men's Sprint Freestyle:  Finn Hågen Krogh   Federico Pellegrino   Len Väljas 
Tour de Ski standings (after 3 of 7 races): (1) Maxim Vylegzhanin  50:27.3 (2) Dario Cologna  +2.1 (3) Petter Northug  +9.0
Women's Sprint Freestyle:  Kikkan Randall   Ingvild Flugstad Østberg   Heidi Weng 
Tour de Ski standings (after 3 of 7 races): (1) Justyna Kowalczyk  35:08.0 (2) Therese Johaug  +50.3 (3) Kristin Størmer Steira  +1:00.9

Ski jumping
Four Hills Tournament:
Stage 2, HS 137 in Garmisch-Partenkirchen, Germany:  Anders Jacobsen   Gregor Schlierenzauer   Anders Bardal 
Tournament standings (after 2 of 4 events): (1) Jacobsen 586.3 points (2) Schlierenzauer 573.8 (3) Tom Hilde  547.7

References

01